Rajapaksa Central College (Sinhala: රාජපක්ෂ මධ්‍ය විද්‍යාලය), located in the Hambantota district, Southern Province of Sri Lanka, began its illustrious journey in 1940 as one of the first central colleges to bear fruit from the vision of the late Dr. C.W.W. Kannangara. It is a mixed school  with a current student population of over 4000. It is also one of First five Central Colleges in Sri Lanka. It is named in honour of D. M. Rajapaksa, who was a Sri Lankan politician and Member of Parliament who represented the Beliatta electorate in Hambantota district from 1947 to 1965. Today, this institution has established itself as one of the top 50 schools on the island, inheriting a great history of over 82 years.

Sports

Battle of the Golds Ruhuna
Rajapaksha Central College plays its annual Big Match with Vijitha Central College, Dickwella. It is also known as Golden Battle of Ruhuna.

Annual Sports Meet 
The students are divided into four houses named
 Sheela 
 Samadhi 
 Pragna 
 Weerya 
The Last Sports Meet in 2016 was won by Weerya for the first time in the school history, and Runners-Up were Sheela. 
In 2014, Winners were Pragna, Runners-Up was Weerya.
In 2012, Winners were Samadhi and Runners-Up was Sheela.
In 2010, Winners were Sheela.

RCC Legends Cricket League 
The RCC Legends Cricket League is an annual cricket tournament organized by Past Pupils Cricket Association of Rajapakshe Central College. The tournament is initiated in the year 2021.

Gallery

References

External links
Old Web Site: 
New Official Web site : 



Educational institutions established in 1940
Buildings and structures in Hambantota
Schools in Hambantota District
Provincial schools in Sri Lanka
1940 establishments in Ceylon